Howiesons Poort (also called HP) is a collection of stone tools with shared design features found in Africa and named after the Howieson's Poort Shelter archeological site near Grahamstown in South Africa. Dating back to the Middle Stone Age, this technocomplex is believed to have lasted around 5,000 years between roughly 65,800 and 59,500 years ago.

Humans of this period as in the earlier Stillbay cultural period showed signs of having used symbolism  and having engaged in the cultural exchange of gifts.

Howiesons Poort culture is characterized by tools that seemingly anticipate many of the characteristics, 'Running ahead of time', of those found in the Upper Palaeolithic period that started 25,000 years later around 40,000 BP. Howiesons Poort culture has been described as "both 'modern' and 'non-modern'".

Date 
The proper date range for Howiesons Poort has been debated. During their 1965 excavation of the name site, archaeologists Janette Deacon and Hilary Deacon dated charcoal remains using radiocarbon dating to 19,000-4,000 years ago. However, this does not match the dates ascertained for Howiesons Poort materials at other sites, which were dated to much older time ranges.

Modern research using optically stimulated luminescence dating has pushed back the date of Howiesons Poort, and it is now estimated to have started 64.8 ka and ended 59.5 ka with a duration of 5.3 ka. This date matches the oxygen isotope stage OIS4 which was a period of aridity and lowering of sea levels in southern Africa.

Within the South African Middle Stone Age temporal sequence, materials associated with Howiesons Poort appear following a gap of 7 thousand years after the end of the Stillbay period. While Howiesons Poort materials mostly appear in various sites around South Africa, some are also present in Namibia and Zimbabwe.

Artifacts associated with Howiesons Poort were first described in 1927 by Reverend P. Stapleton, a Jesuit schoolteacher at St Aidan's College, and John Hewitt, a zoologist and director of the local Albany museum. The period name was given to their finds by AJH Goodwin and Clarence van Riet Lowe in 1929. Until the mid-1970s, Howieson’s Poort industry was taken to be a variety of the Magosian industry, which would have made it intermediate in time and technology between the Middle Stone Age and Late Stone Age.

Technology 

Howiesons Poort is associated with various archaeological artifacts. The most notable come from composite weapons. These were made from "geometric backed" blades that were hafted together with heated ochre and gum compound glue.  These blades are sometimes called segments, crescents, lunates or microliths, and are the type fossils for identifying a technology as Howiesons Poort. Blades from the Howiesons Poort assemblages were produced by soft hammer percussion on marginal platforms and the backed tools of this industry subsequently fashioned from these flakes. Organic residues preserved on the tips of these stone tools show not only that they were hafted but also that they were used as hunting weapons. Sarah Wurz's study shows that the general assemblage, frequency of retouch pieces, and the variability in formal tool morphologies still need to be looked into further. Meanwhile, Harper's study at Rose Cottage contain a confusion concerning the backed pieces and laterally crested blades

The discovery of bone points within Howiesons Poort layers at Sibudu Cave in South Africa has expanded the confirmed tool types for the technocomplex and has expanded the variety of technological innovations associated with the Middle Stone Age. The presence of a high percentage of the small antelope small blue duiker remains have been suggested as evidence for the use of traps.

Fine-grained stone such as silcrete and quartz make up a large percentage of Howiesons Poort artifacts than in both earlier and later Middle Stone Age cultures. Howiesons Poort tools seem not to differ greatly in shape from those of the Late Stone Age lithic tools such as those manufactured by Wilton culture. However, Howiesons Poort flakes tend to be larger than Wilton flakes but somewhat smaller than the typical flake and blade tools found elsewhere in the Middle Stone Age.  They have been described as 'fully "Upper Palaeolithic" in almost every recognized technological and typological sense'. The Howiesons Poort Industry is anomalous not only for its early appearance, which Vishnyatsky calls 'running ahead of time', but because it is replaced by Middle Stone Age industries that are similar to those of pre-Howiesons Poort. This change seems to have happened gradually.

Symbolism 
Like the earlier Stillbay industry, creators of Howiesons Poort artifacts seem to have engaged in symbolic behavior, having left behind engraved ochre, ostrich eggshells and shell beads.  There is a particularly abundant and diverse use of ochre as a pigment, which has been interpreted as reflecting an increasingly complex symbolic culture.

Researcher Sarah Wurz noted that "Not only was ochre collected and returned to the site but there is evidence in the ochre 'pencils' with ground facets that it was powdered for use. Ochre may have had many uses but the possibility that it was used as a body paint, and therefore had served a symbolic purpose."

Disappearance 
Researchers have questioned why Howiesons Poort did not seem to survive. Archaeologist Lyn Wadley has noted that "if the Howiesons Poort backed blade production was an important marker of modern human behaviour it is difficult to explain why it should have lasted for more than 20,000 years and then have been replaced by 'pre-modern' technology?" p. 203

It has been suggested that backed blades played a role in gift exchanges of hunting equipment, and when culture changes stopped this exchange the need for their manufacture also ceased. This idea is supported by evidence that the long-distance transport of non-local raw materials (which such gift culture would have encouraged) is reduced after the Howiesons Poort period.

While the end of this technocomplex might be due to climate change, this seems unlikely, since its disappearance does not link to any identifiable climatic event.

Sites 
{
  "type": "ExternalData",
  "service": "page",
  "title": "ROCEEH/Howiesons_Poort.map"
}
South Africa
 Klasies River Caves
 Howieson's Poort Shelter
 Sibudu Cave
 Peers Cave (Skildegat)
 Diepkloof Rock Shelter
 Nelson Bay Cave
 Boomplaas Cave
 Border Cave
 Umhlatuzana
 Rose Cottage Cave
 Cave of Hearths
 Sehonghong Moshebi's Shelter /Ntloana Tsoana
Montagu
Duinefontein
Namibia
 Apollo 11 Cave
 Aar l
 Bremen IC
 Haalenberg
 Pockenbanck
Zimbabwe
 Matopos : Nswatugi

Quotes 
Symbolism

Relationship to the Late Stone Age

References 

Middle Stone Age cultures